Düsseldorf Wehrhahn station is located about one kilometre north of Düsseldorf Hauptbahnhof in central Düsseldorf in the German state of North Rhine-Westphalia. It is on the Cologne–Duisburg line and is classified by Deutsche Bahn as a category 4 station.

Düsseldorf Wehrhahn is also a stop for several bus routes. It is also stop of the new Wehrhahn-line which consists four Stadtbahn lines.

Station layout

The station is centrally located between the districts of Düsseldorf-Stadtmitte, Düsseldorf-Flingern and Düsseldorf-Düsseltal. The station is located below a road bridge, over which buses and Stadtbahn cross the station area and which is also the beginning of Grafenberger Allee.

Lines
The station is served by Rhine-Ruhr S-Bahn lines S1 (every 30 minutes during the day), S6 (every 20 minutes) and S11 (every 20 minutes). Six tram lines and seven bus routes stop at Düsseldorf Wehrhahn stop above the station and at Birkenstraße and Elisabethkirche stops, which are located on the exit to Ackerstraße in Flingern-Nord district.

Stadtbahn
The Düsseldorf Stadtbahn has a tunnel from Düsseldorf-Bilk station to Düsseldorf-Wehrhahn station, known as the Wehrhahn line. This 3.5 km tunnel was completed in 2016. Just as every other underground line opened previously in Düsseldorf, the Wehrhahn line is a replacement for current surface tram lines. The trams on this line enter the new tunnel via a ramp at Bilk station and run from there underneath the city centre towards the north-east, where they emerge shortly before Wehrhahn railway station, hence the line's nickname. Five new underground stations and the station Heinrich-Heine-Allee are part of the line, which serve an estimated daily passenger volume of approximately 53,000. These new stations are Pempelforter Straße, Schadowstraße, the existing station Heinrich-Heine-Allee, Benrather Straße, Graf-Adolf-Platz and Kirchplatz (Düsseldorf) in the direction from Wehrhahn station to Bilk station.

Notes

References
 
 

Düsseldorf VRR stations
Rhine-Ruhr S-Bahn stations
Railway stations in Düsseldorf
S1 (Rhine-Ruhr S-Bahn)
S6 (Rhine-Ruhr S-Bahn)
S11 (Rhine-Ruhr S-Bahn)
Railway stations in Germany opened in 1967